The discography of Placebo, an English alternative rock band, consists of eight studio albums, three compilation albums, six extended plays, and 33 singles. Their self-titled debut album was released in 1996 and peaked at number five on the UK Albums Chart. A single from the album, "Nancy Boy", peaked at number four on the UK Singles Chart. Placebo's next studio album, 1998's Without You I'm Nothing, peaked at number seven in both the UK and France. The singles "Pure Morning" and "You Don't Care About Us" both reached the top five on the UK Singles Chart. Those were Placebo's last singles to make the top five in the UK.

In 2000, the band released Black Market Music. The album peaked at number one in France, number four in Germany, number six in the UK, and number seven in Austria. Placebo continued their chart success with the album Sleeping with Ghosts in 2003. It reached number one in France, number two in Germany, number three in Switzerland, number four in Portugal, and number six in Austria. It was also certified two times platinum in France. In 2004, they released a compilation album, Once More with Feeling: Singles 1996–2004, that peaked at number eight in the UK.

Placebo's fifth studio album, Meds, was released in 2006 and topped the charts in Austria, France, and Switzerland. Their sixth studio album, Battle for the Sun, was released in 2009 and topped the charts in Austria, France, Germany, and Switzerland; it was the band's fourth consecutive album to peak at number one in France. All of their first seven studio albums have reached the top twenty in the UK.

The band's eighth studio album, Never Let Me Go, was released on 25 March 2022. It was made available for pre-order on 9 November 2021.

Albums

Studio albums

Live albums

Compilation albums

Extended plays
Live at La Cigale (2006; exclusive download on iTunes and 7Digital)
Extended Play '07 (2007)
Exclusive Session (2007)
Live at Angkor Wat (2011; exclusive download on iTunes)
B3 (2012)
Life's What You Make It (2016)

Singles

DVDs

Notes

References

External links

Discographies of British artists
Rock music group discographies